Barakani may refer to:

 Barakani, Anjouan: a small town on the island of Anjouan in the Comoros
 Barakani, Mwali, Comoros   
 Barakani, Mayotte